William Wistar Comfort (1874 – December 24, 1955) was president of Haverford College.

Life
Comfort was born in Germantown, Pennsylvania and raised a Quaker.  He graduated from Haverford College in 1894 and received a Ph.D. from Harvard University in 1902 with dissertation "The Development of the Character Types in the French Chansons de Geste". Later he translated from Old French four 12th-century Arthurian Romances by Chrétien de Troyes (Modern Library, 1914) and the 13th-century Queste del Saint Graal  (Quest of the Holy Grail). He was a polymath, with other written works on such topics as Quakerism, children's literature, and the poet William Cowper.

Comfort served as President of Haverford College for 23 years, from 1917 to 1940, and was succeeded by journalist Felix Morley. 

He continued to teach until 1953, and died at his home located on the campus in 1955.  He was survived by his wife of 53 years, the former Mary Foles, five children, and several grandchildren including a mathematician named after him (:de:W. Wistar Comfort). His papers are held at Haverford.

References

External links

 
 
 
 

1874 births
1955 deaths
Haverford College faculty
Haverford College alumni
Harvard University alumni
Educators from Philadelphia
Presidents of Haverford College